Clotilde (or Chrodechildis) ( 500–531) was the daughter of King Clovis I of the Franks and Queen Clotilde and was the queen of the Visigothic King Amalaric. She was born circa 500. The favorite child of her parents, she was saddened by her father's death in 511. 

Clotilde married Amalaric in about 526, and ties between both families were initially positive. Clotilde was a Catholic, while Amalaric and his fellow-Visigoths were Arians. Clotilde refused to adopt her husband's religious practices and complained to her kin that she was persecuted for her faith. Amalaric was subsequently kicked out from Narbonne. War ensued in 531 between her brother, King Childebert I, and her husband, at Barcelona, Spain. According to Isidore of Seville, Amalaric was eventually defeated, and then assassinated by his own men  while Clotilde traveled to Francia with the Frankish army, but died on the journey. Her cause of death was not recorded. Childebert I brought her corpse to Paris for burial. Her death was greatly mourned by her mother and siblings.

References

Visigothic queens consort
Year of birth unknown
500 births
531 deaths
6th-century Frankish women
6th-century Frankish nobility
6th-century people of the Visigothic Kingdom
Daughters of kings